The 1996 Canada Cup was the second edition to take place and was hosted by Edmonton.  It was a women's rugby union competition and featured New Zealand, France, the USA and the hosts, Canada. New Zealand had missed the previous World Cup in 1994 and, aside from a couple of games against an untried Australia, had played no international rugby since 1991, when they had lost to the USA in the World Cup semi-finals.  Despite this they won all three games they played and won the tournament.

Final table

Results

See also
Women's international rugby - includes all women's international match results
Churchill Cup

1996 rugby union tournaments for national teams
1996
1996 in Canadian rugby union
1996 in New Zealand rugby union
1996 in American rugby union
1996–97 in French rugby union
1996 in women's rugby union
1996 in American women's sports
1996 in Canadian women's sports
1996 in French women's sport